Parlia is an encyclopedia of opinion, a project looking to map all of the world's opinions. The name Parlia is derived from the Old English word for negotiation, to "parley." The project was founded by Turi Munthe and J. Paul Neeley.  Turi Munthe previously founded Demotix, at the time the "world’s largest network of photojournalists" which sold to Corbis, a Bill Gates company, in 2013. J. Paul Neeley previously founded Yossarian Lives.

Parlia is not a debate site, but looking to "showcasing all opinions in a calm, descriptive voice." The ambition of Parlia is to build a "platform that could map all opinions about everything."

History 
The initial funding for development of the Parlia prototype came from a Paul Hamlyn Foundation Ideas and Pioneer Fund and a Google Digital News Innovation Fund grant (DNI).  According to Google "The Digital News Innovation Fund (DNI Fund) is a European programme that's part of the Google News Initiative, an effort to help journalism thrive in the digital age." The Google DNI grant was awarded on the fund's 4th round.

Parlia is part of the Somerset House Exchange program, based in London, UK.

References 

Specialized encyclopedias

External links